Dean Forrest Sittig (born March 2, 1961) is an American biomedical informatician specializing in clinical informatics. He is a professor in Biomedical Informatics at the University of Texas Health Science Center at Houston and Executive Director of the Clinical Informatics Research Collaborative (CIRCLE). Sittig was elected as a fellow of the American College of Medical Informatics in 1992, the Healthcare Information and Management Systems Society in 2011, and was a founding member of the International Academy of Health Sciences Informatics in 2017. Since 2004, he has worked with Joan S. Ash, a professor at Oregon Health & Science University to interview several Pioneers in Medical Informatics, including G. Octo Barnett, MD, Morris F. Collen, MD, Donald E. Detmer, MD, Donald A. B. Lindberg, MD, Nina W. Matheson, ML, DSc, Clement J. McDonald, MD, and Homer R. Warner, MD, PhD.

Education
Sittig earned a bachelor's degree in science and a master's degree in biomedical engineering before he trained in medical informatics at the University of Utah School of Medicine and the LDS Hospital under Reed M. Gardner and Homer R. Warner. His dissertation was entitled, “COMPAS: A Computerized Patient Advice System to Direct Ventilatory Care." He won the 1987 Martin Epstein Award at the Annual Symposium on Computer Applications in Medical Care (now the American Medical Informatics Association) for this work.

Research
His research focuses on understanding the sociotechnical risks of, and solutions to address, unintended consequences associated with design, development, implementation, and use of various health information technologies (HIT), including computer-based provider order entry, clinical decision support within electronic health records (EHRs), and most recently in EHR-related patient safety. Along with Hardeep Singh, he developed an “8-dimension socio-technical model for safe and effective HIT implementation and use”. A modification of the model was used by the National Academy of Medicine (NAM), in a sentinel event report from the Joint Commission, and the National Quality Forum to describe the socio-technical challenges associated with measuring HIT safety. This model has also been used in a variety of HIT-related research studies including: identification of keys to implementing novel clinical prediction algorithms, exploring barriers to implementation of clinical information systems in nursing homes, development of a childhood cancer passport for care, and development of a questionnaire regarding EHR-related safety concerns.

Sittig has published over 600 scientific articles and 6 books. (h-index = 82).

Honors 
In 1992 he was elected a Fellow of the American College of Medical Informatics (ACMI). In 2017 he was elected an Inaugural Fellow of the International Academy of Health Sciences Informatics (IAHSI). In 2019 he was elected a Fellow of the American Medical Informatics Association (AMIA).

Personal life
Dean F. Sittig is married to Joann Kaalaas-Sittig.

Books and representative papers 
 Sittig DF, Singh H. (2012) Electronic health records and national patient-safety goals. N Engl J Med. 367(19):1854-60. doi: 10.1056/NEJMsb1205420. 
 Sittig DF, Singh H. (2010) A new sociotechnical model for studying health information technology in complex adaptive healthcare systems. Qual Saf Health Care. Suppl 3:i68-74. doi: 10.1136/qshc.2010.042085. 
 Sittig DF, Singh H. (2009) Eight rights of safe electronic health record use. JAMA. 302(10):1111-3. doi: 10.1001/jama.2009.1311. 
 Wright A, Henkin S, Feblowitz J, McCoy AB, Bates DW, Sittig DF. (2013) Early results of the meaningful use program for electronic health records. N Engl J Med. 368(8):779-80. doi: 10.1056/NEJMc1213481. 
 Singh H, Spitzmueller C, Petersen NJ, Sawhney MK, Sittig DF. (2013) Information overload and missed test results in electronic health record-based settings. JAMA Intern Med. 173(8):702-4. doi: 10.1001/2013.jamainternmed.61. 
 Sittig DF, Krall M, Kaalaas-Sittig J, Ash JS. (2005) Emotional aspects of computer-based provider order entry: a qualitative study. J Am Med Inform Assoc.12(5):561-7. 
 Sittig DF, Pace NL, Gardner RM, Beck E, Morris AH. (1989) Implementation of a computerized patient advice system using the HELP clinical information system. Comput Biomed Res. 22(5):474-87. 
 Sittig DF, Wright A, Osheroff JA, Middleton B, Teich JM, Ash JS, Campbell E, Bates DW. Grand challenges in clinical decision support. J Biomed Inform. 2008 Apr;41(2):387-92. 
 Sittig DF, Singh H. (2011) Defining health information technology-related errors: new developments since to err is human. Arch Intern Med. 171(14):1281-4. doi: 10.1001/archinternmed.2011.327. 
 Sittig DF. (2002) Personal health records on the internet: a snapshot of the pioneers at the end of the 20th Century. Int J Med Inform. 65(1):1-6.

References 

American bioinformaticians
Health informaticians
Living people
1961 births
Mathematicians from Pennsylvania
People from Bellefonte, Pennsylvania
University of Utah School of Medicine alumni
University of Texas Health Science Center at Houston faculty
Penn State College of Engineering alumni